Marilyn Plessmann Martínez was a pageant titleholder, was born in Valle de la Pascua, Venezuela in 1956. She was the Miss Venezuela International titleholder for 1972, and was the official representative of Venezuela to the Miss International 1972 pageant held in Tokyo, Japan, when she classified in the Top 15 semifinalists.

Plessmann competed in the national beauty pageant Miss Venezuela 1972 and obtained the title of Miss Venezuela International. She represented the Guárico state.

References

External links
Miss Venezuela Official Website
Miss International Official Website

1956 births
Living people
People from Guárico
Miss Venezuela International winners
Miss International 1972 delegates